Pickin' on Modest Mouse is a bluegrass tribute album to Modest Mouse by Iron Horse; a part of the Pickin' On Series. On January 9, 2007, the album was reissued with 4 bonus tracks under the title: Something You've Never Heard Before: The Bluegrass Tribute to Modest Mouse.

Track listing
 "Polar Opposites" – 3:27 (The Lonesome Crowded West)
 "Dark Center of the Universe" – 3:51 (The Moon & Antarctica)
 "Float On" – 4:13 (Good News for People Who Love Bad News)
 "Ocean Breathes Salty" – 4:18 (Good News for People Who Love Bad News)
 "Trailer Trash" – 4:08 (The Lonesome Crowded West)
 "Gravity Rides Everything" – 4:46 (The Moon and Antarctica)
 "Interstate 8" – 4:13 (Interstate 8)
 "A Different City" – 3:20 (The Moon and Antarctica)
 "The World at Large" – 3:39 (Good News for People Who Love Bad News)
 "3rd Planet" – 4:27 (The Moon and Antarctica)
2007 Reissue Track list:
 "Polar Opposites" – 3:27 
 "Dark Center of the Universe" – 3:51 
 "Float On" – 4:13 
 "Ocean Breathes Salty" – 4:18 
 "Trailer Trash" – 4:08 
 "Gravity Rides Everything" – 4:46 
 "Interstate 8" – 4:13 
 "A Different City" – 3:20 
 "The World at Large" – 3:39 
 "3rd Planet" – 4:27
 "Satin in a Coffin" – 3:21 (Good News for People Who Love Bad News)
 "Dramamine" – 4:30 (This Is a Long Drive for Someone with Nothing to Think About)
 "Baby Blue Sedan" – 4:08 (Building Nothing Out of Something)
 "Night on the Sun" – 4:40 (Night on the Sun)

2004 albums
Modest Mouse